Sieradz  is a city on the Warta river in central Poland with 40,891 inhabitants (2021). It is the seat of the Sieradz County, situated in the Łódź Voivodeship. Historically it was the capital of one of the minor duchies in Greater Poland.

It is one of the oldest cities in Poland. Sieradz was an important city of medieval Poland, thrice being a location for the election of the Polish monarchs. Polish Kings chaired six assemblies from here.

History

The oldest settlements can be roughly traced back to the 6th century. The oldest known mention of Sieradz comes from the Bull of Gniezno from 1136. In the mid 13th century it was conferred with municipal rights by Duke Casimir I of Kuyavia. It had also welcomed many settlers from Scotland and the Netherlands after the 13th century. During the fragmentation of Poland, initially it was part of the Seniorate Province, and then from 1231 it was the capital of the Duchy of Sieradz, which in 1339 was transformed into the Sieradz Voivodeship of Poland. Polish king Casimir III the Great erected a castle in Sieradz. In the Middle Ages the town was attacked by the Mongols during all three Mongol invasions of Poland, Bohemians and Teutonic Knights.

Sieradz was a significant royal town of Poland. In 1445 the election of King Casimir IV Jagiellon took place in Sieradz. Until the 16th century the town used to be an important trade centre. Merchants from Spain and Portugal were frequently visiting the town for trade and commerce. In the 17th century due to the Swedish invasions, plagues, fires and floods the town lost its trading importance and fell from its prime. In the 18th century the reconstruction of town commenced. The residents during that time were only approximately 1,500.

Sieradz was annexed by Prussia in the Second Partition of Poland in 1793. On 13 November 1806 a Polish uprising against the Prussians took place in Sieradz, and in 1807 it was included in the short-lived Polish Duchy of Warsaw. After the duchy's dissolution, in 1815, it became part of so-called Congress Poland within the Russian Partition of Poland. It was the capital of a district within the Kalisz Governorate of the Russian Empire. During the January Uprising, on 18 September 1863, Polish insurgents attacked Russian troops stationed in the town. Further clashes between Polish insurgents and Russian troops took place on 24 January and 18 June 1864. After World War I, in 1918, Poland regained independence and control of the town.

World War II

With the joint German-Soviet invasion of Poland and the outbreak of the Second World War in 1939, Sieradz was attacked on September 9 and occupied by the Wehrmacht. Annexed by Nazi Germany, it was renamed Schieratz and administered as part of the county or district (kreis) of the same name within Reichsgau Wartheland. Estimates are that at least 40% of the population of Sieradz was Jewish prior to the German occupation. Today, Sieradz commemorates a Day of Judaism each year in January.

In mid-September 1939, the Germans organized a temporary prisoner-of-war camp in the local prison, in which they held nearly 3,000 Polish soldiers, despite the prison capacity being 1,100. During the German occupation, the population was subjected to various atrocities. Already on 15 September 1939, the Germans carried out the first public execution of seven Poles in Sieradz. In early November 1939, the Germans arrested 62 members of the local elite in order to terrorize the population before the Polish Independence Day (11 November), and then on 14 November they forced local Jews to dig pits for the victims, and afterwards murdered 20 hostages. Among the victims were activists, teachers, school principals, craftsmen, policemen, pre-war mayor Ignacy Mąkowski, local officials, judges, and a boy scout. 522 Poles, families of teachers, officials, policemen, merchants, craftsmen and shop owners, were expelled in late 1939.

The town was subjected to severe Germanisation, and the Nazis destroyed traces of Polish culture, destroying historical records, monuments, and buildings. Street names were changed in an effort to wipe out any connection with a Polish identity.

The local prison was one of the most important German prisons in the Reichsgau Wartheland. Its prisoners, predominantly Poles and Jews, were subjected to insults, beatings, forced labour, tortures and executions. Prisoners were given very low food rations, and meals were even prepared from rotten vegetables, spoiled fish and dead dogs. Many prisoners died of exhaustion, starvation or torture. After the war, Polish historian Antoni Galiński was able to identify 968 people who died or were shot in the prison and its subcamps in 1940–1945, however the overall number of deaths is certainly higher. Despite such circumstances, the Polish resistance movement still operated in the area. The last executed prisoner was Antonina Chrystkowa, a female member of the Home Army resistance organization, who was beheaded with an axe on 18 January 1945. Another German prison was operated in the present-day district of Chabie; it was subordinate to the main prison in Sieradz.

Bombed by the Soviets, more than 100 residents were killed. After an assault lasting three days, the Red Army arrived on 23 January 1945. The day before the retreat of the Germans, the historic Danielewicz Palace was burned down. The town was restored to Poland, although with a Soviet-installed communist regime, which remained in power until the Fall of Communism in the 1980s.

Recent period
In 1947, local Polish youth established a secret anti-communist resistance organization, initially called the Union of Patriotic Youth (Związek Młodzieży Patriotycznej), and in 1949 renamed to Katyń to commemorate the Katyn massacre in which the Soviets murdered nearly 22,000 Poles in 1940. Its activity extended to the nearby cities of Zduńska Wola, Warta, Łódź and even Włocławek, and included collecting weapons, secret training, intelligence, and publishing and distribution of independent Polish press and leaflets. Its leader was Zbigniew Tur, a native of pre-war eastern Poland annexed by the Soviet Union, who as a teenager was arrested and deported to forced labour by both the Germans (twice) and the Soviets, before returning to Poland in 1946. The organization was eventually crushed by the communists, who sentenced its members to 1.5 to 10 years in prison in 1951. During the court hearings, the townspeople gathered near the courthouse and demonstrated their sympathy and support for the arrested youth.

Post-war economic activities included clothing manufacture, cereal-milling, spirit distillery, potato-farming and other agricultural activities. In 1957 the knitting plant "Sira" was founded. From 1975 to 1998 Sieradz was the capital of the Sieradz Voivodeship.

Historical rulers

Dukes of Sieradz-Łęczyca 
 1228-1232 Henry I the Bearded (Filip I Brodaty)
 1232-1233 Konrad of Masovia (Konrad Mazowiecki)
 1234-1247 Konrad of Masovia (Konrad Mazowiecki)
 1247-1261 Casimir I of Kuyavia (Kazimierz I kujawski)
 1261-1275 Leszek the Black (Leszek Czarny)
 1275-1294 divided into two duchies of Sieradz and Łęczyca (below)
 1294-1297 Ladislaus III the Short (Władysław Łokietek)
 1297-1305 Wenceslaus II of Bohemia (Wacław II Czeski)
after 1305 parts of the united Kingdom of Poland initially as two vassal duchies, later incorporated as Łęczyca Voivodeship and Sieradz Voivodeship.

Dukes of Sieradz 
 1233-1234 Bolesław I of Masovia (Bolesław I Mazowiecki)
 1275-1288 Leszek the Black (Leszek Czarny)
 1288-1294 Ladislaus III the Short (Władysław Łokietek )
 1327-1339 Przemysł of Inowrocław

After 1305 part of the united Kingdom of Poland as a vassal duchy, later after 1339 incorporated by the Polish king Casimir III the Great as the Sieradz Voivodeship.

Politics

Sieradz constituency 
Members of Parliament (Sejm) elected from Sieradz constituency
 Andrzej Biernat, PO
 Agnieszka Hanajczyk, PO
 Cezary Tomczyk, PO
 Artur Dunin, PO
 Wojciech Szczęsny Zarzycki, PiS
 Tadeusz Woźniak, PiS
 Marek Mauszewski, PiS
 Krystyna Grabicka, PiS
 Piotr Polak, PiS
 Stanisław Olas, PSL
 Mieczysław Łuczak, PSL
 Anita Błochowiak, LiD
 Denise Sieradzki, PiS

President of Sieradz 
 Paweł Osiewała

Sport, tourism and recreation 

Sieradz has a fully equipped Sports town centre, with three proper football pitches, running track, two sports grounds, hotel, restaurant, tennis courts, sauna, health club, games, swimming pool and well guarded river side swim area. It competes in the lower leagues.

The natural forests on the banks of river Warta makes an ideal place for mushroom pickers. The Rynek (town square) filled with historic architecture also makes a perfect tourism place with local shops selling various products of good quality and brands. The churches in Sieradz carry historical significance and are well restored.

Development 
Sieradz dramatically developed since 2007 with new residential projects & townships. Sieradz has some attractive shopping malls, such as Galeria sieradzka, Dekada, Rondo and several open markets. Its attracts residents from nearby villages and towns as well and makes Sieradz a prime shopping destination. The Sieradz City administration successfully holds Open Hair Festival every year and the town is very much well known for this event.

Notable people 

 Leszek II the Black (–1288), High Duke of Poland
 Jan Gruszczyński, a medieval Primate of Poland 
 Cyprian Bazylik (–), musician, writer, printer
 Ary Szternfeld (1905–1980), aerospace scientist
 Antoni ”Antoine” Cierplikowski (1884–1976), celebrity hairdresser
 Arek Hersh, Holocaust survivor and educator
 Zalman Ben-Ya'akov (1897–1959), Israeli politician
 Hymie Weiss, American gangster
 Hersh Leyb Zhitnitski (15 July 1891 – Summer 1942) Yiddish writer
 Dina Shayevitsh (1891–1942?) Yiddish Actor

Twin cities
 Gaggenau, Germany
 Annemasse, France
 Yambol, Bulgaria

See also
Dukes of Sieradz-Łęczyca

References

External links

Official Sieradz town website

Cities and towns in Łódź Voivodeship
Sieradz County
Sieradz Voivodeship (1339–1793)
Kalisz Governorate
Łódź Voivodeship (1919–1939)
Nazi war crimes in Poland